Entente Sportive de Bingerville (ES Bingerville or ESB) is an Ivorian football club based in Bingerville, they are a member of the Ivorian Football Federation Premiere Division.

History
The club was founded in 1995 as A.S. Transporteurs Bingerville and renamed to Entente Sportive de Bingerville in the year of 1998. They play at the Stade Municipal. The club colours are white, red and yellow.

Performance in CAF competitions
CAF Confederation Cup: 1 appearance
2008 – First Round

Current squad

References

Football clubs in Abidjan
Association football clubs established in 1995
1995 establishments in Ivory Coast